Mejía is a municipality of Sucre, Venezuela. The capital is San Antonio del Golfo.

Municipalities of Sucre (state)